
The Upland News was a weekly or semiweekly newspaper circulated in Upland, California, between 1901 and 1974.

Family ownership

The newspaper was established in 1901 by Walter Curtis Westland, who came from Michigan. Its office was then situated in a small house on A Street in Upland, but within a year a new building was constructed for it.

Westland died of consumption on December 1, 1902, and his wife, Ella L. Westland, took over as editor and publisher. She left the business in December 1910, and her son, W.E. Westland, who had been part owner, purchased her share.

W.L. Miller was editor in 1910-11.

In 1912, the newspaper office was "considerably damaged" in a fire that swept through Upland's downtown district.

In 1919, the paper increased its publication frequency from weekly to semiweekly. It later went back to weekly.

Other ownership
In 1928, the company was sold to J.B. Hungerford and his son, John Hungerford, both of Carroll, Iowa. They moved to California to take over management. Their first editor and publisher was Richard T. Baldwin of Albion, Michigan, who later bought the newspaper. Baldwin sold the paper to Vernon Paine and Harry M. Guy in June 1929.

Guy retired in 1939 and sold his interest to Paine, who increased the rate of publication to twice, and then three times, a week.

Paine acquired the Ontario Herald from A.Q. Miller about 1946 and announced a year later that the two staffs would be combined as a five-days-per-week daily.

In 1947, the newspaper was known as the Upland News-Herald, and that year it published an extra edition when Chaffey College was selected as the Western team for the Little Rose Bowl football game.

Three years later, publisher W.P. McDonald announced the suspension of the News-Herald, stating he planned to issue a weekly newspaper.

Mel Hodell bought the Upland News from Vernon Paine on October 1, 1958, and the Montclair Tribune on September 1, 1960; he began publishing the Cucamonga News on December 10, 1961. In 1967, he sold the three newspapers to Bonita Publishing Company. At that time, Jack Harper was editor of the Upland News.

Marcella Case became editor under Bonita in August 1970.
The newspaper ceased publication in 1974.

References and notes

External links

 Reminiscence of Mel Hodell's acquisition of the Upland News in 1958 and how it was printed.

Defunct weekly newspapers
Defunct newspapers published in California